Miss Mary is a 1957 Indian comedy film directed by L.V. Prasad. The movie is an AVM production, written by Hargobind Duggal, and directed by L. V. Prasad. The original Missamma was directed in Telugu in 1955 and was remade as Missiamma in Tamil with Savitri playing the title role in both films. It was remade in Hindi as Miss Mary in 1957 with Meena Kumari in the titular role, keeping Jamuna as the constant factor in all these films.  L. V. Prasad directed all three versions. The music was by Hemant Kumar with the lyrics and dialogue written by Rajendra Krishan. The songs were sung by Kishore Kumar, Lata Mangeshkar, Asha Bhosle, Geeta Dutt and Mohammed Rafi. The film's script was adapted by Chakrapani from two Indian Bengali-language novels: Rabindranath Maitra's Manmoyee Girls School and Sharadindu Bandyopadhyay Detective.

Meena Kumari, who was to later become famous for her tragedy roles meriting the sobriquet "Queen of Tragedy", acted in a few light-hearted roles in the 1950s in films such as Azaad (1955), Mem Sahib (1956), Shararat (1959 film), Kohinoor (1960) and Miss Mary. For Gemini Ganesan (who was introduced to the Hindi-speaking film audience with this film), and for Meena Kumari, Miss Mary was one of the biggest hits of that year.

Plot
The film is a light-hearted comedy with Meena Kumari (who regularly played tragedienne roles) performing one of her rare comic acts. The story is about Arun (Gemini Ganeshan), an unemployed teacher who comes across an advertisement offering a job at the Lakshmi School with the proviso that only married couples need apply. He meets Miss Mary (Meena Kumari), a Christian girl who is badly in need of a job to pay off her parents' debt. She agrees to pose as his wife. They hire Nakdau (Om Prakash), a beggar-cum-conman as a servant to keep up the pretense. The school owners (Rai Sahib and his wife), are looking for their long lost daughter Laxmi (hence the Laxmi School), who went missing sixteen years ago and the only thing tying her to them is a locket and an identification mark in the form of a mole on her left foot. They employ a detective Raju (Kishore Kumar) to find her. Raju is an orphan brought up as a nephew by the Rai Sahib. The old couple find a resemblance in Mary to their daughter and show her a photo of Laxmi that looks like her. Mary tells them that she can't be their daughter as she was brought up in a Christian environment by Christian parents.

Mary feels bad for lying about her married status to the Rai Sahib and his wife. She and Arun start liking each other in spite of their constant bickering. The owner's other daughter and Mary's biological sister Sita (Jamuna) has a fondness for Arun which upsets Mary. There are several comic sequences involving Raju and his friend. The truth is revealed about Mary being the Rai Sahib's daughter Laxmi when her foster parents arrive.

Cast
 Meena Kumari as Laxmi / Miss Mary
 Gemini Ganeshan as Arun
 Kishore Kumar as Raju
 Jamuna as Sita
 Achala Sachdev as Laxmi & Sita's Mother
 Jagdish Sethi as Rai Sahib (Laxmi & Sita's Father)
 Randhir as John	
 Om Prakash as Nakdau
 Marutirao Parab as Interviewer
 Shivraj as Laxmi's Foster Father
 A. Karunanidhi as Karunanidhi
 Kesari as Vaidji

Soundtrack
The music and background score was composed by Hemant Kumar and the lyrics were penned by Rajendra Krishan.

The songs were popular, especially "Gaana Na Aaya, Bajaana Na Aaya" sung by Kishore Kumar, "Yeh Mard Bade Dilsard, Bade Bedard", "O Raat Ke Musafir Chanda Zara Bata De", "Brindavan Ka Krishna Kanhaiya" sung by Lata Mangeshkar & Mohammed Rafi.
Lata Mangeshkar and Asha Bhosle, who first sang together in Ladli (1949), had a duet in the film: "Sakhi Ri Sun Bole Papiha Us Paar". Asha, despite her lack of training from her father Dinanath Mangeshkar and other Ustads, was able to follow Lata ably in her sargam-taan, keeping "perfect timing".

Although Kishore Kumar isn't the hero of this film, he displays his immense musical talent in the song "Gaana Na Aaya". With crazy lyrics like "O My Sita / Paplu Papita", the song is a nutty medley of various music forms and styles, which includes the nursery rhyme Three Blind Mice.

Track listing

References

External links 
 

1957 films
Films shot in India
1950s Hindi-language films
Films scored by Hemant Kumar
Films directed by L. V. Prasad
Hindi remakes of Tamil films
AVM Productions films
Hindi remakes of Telugu films